Lee Min-ji (born November 1, 1988) is a South Korean actress. She began her acting career in short films such as See You Tomorrow (2011) and Safe (2013), and has starred in leading roles in the indies End of Animal (2011), Jane (2016) and the television series Schoolgirl Detectives (2014).

Filmography

Film

Television series

Web series

Music video

Awards and nominations

References

External links 
  
 Lee Min-ji at INK Corp 
 
 
 

1988 births
Living people
South Korean film actresses
South Korean television actresses
21st-century South Korean actresses